Tang Jingzhi (born 15 September 1986 in Hangzhou, Zhejiang) is a female Chinese swimmer, who won a silver medal for China at the 2008 Summer Olympics.

Major achievements
2001 Goodwill Games - 1st 400m free;
2002/2006 World Short-Course Championships - 1st/2nd 4 × 200 m free relay;
2002 Asian Games - 1st 4 × 200 m free relay, 3rd 400m free;
2005 National Champions Tournament - 1st 400m free;
2006 Asian Championships - 1st 200m free

Records
2002 Moscow World Short-Course Championships - 7.46.30, 4 × 200 m free relay (WR)

References
http://2008teamchina.olympic.cn/index.php/personview/personsen/777

1986 births
Living people
Swimmers from Zhejiang
Olympic silver medalists for China
Olympic swimmers of China
Sportspeople from Hangzhou
Swimmers at the 2008 Summer Olympics
Chinese female freestyle swimmers
Medalists at the FINA World Swimming Championships (25 m)
Asian Games medalists in swimming
Swimmers at the 2002 Asian Games
Swimmers at the 2006 Asian Games
Medalists at the 2008 Summer Olympics
Olympic silver medalists in swimming
Asian Games gold medalists for China
Asian Games bronze medalists for China
Medalists at the 2002 Asian Games
Medalists at the 2006 Asian Games
Competitors at the 2001 Goodwill Games
20th-century Chinese women
21st-century Chinese women